Capis is a genus of moths of the family Noctuidae.

Species
 Capis archaia L. Handfield & D. Handfield, 2006
 Capis curvata Grote, 1882

References
 Capis at Markku Savela's Lepidoptera and Some Other Life Forms
 Handfield, L. & Handfield, D. (2006). "A new species of Capis (Lepidoptera: Noctuidae) from Québec, Canada." The Canadian Entomologist 138: 333-338.
 Natural History Museum Lepidoptera genus database

Calpinae